The Order of Outstanding Merit (Uzbek: Buyuk xizmatlari uchun) is an order that is currently awarded by the Republic of Uzbekistan.

Design 
The Order of Outstanding Merit is made from 925 probe silver alloy plated with 0.25 micron thick gold. 

The order itself is a ruby colored eight-pointed star with scattered green colored triangles in between each end of the star. In the center is a blue colored globe with the shape of Uzbekistan on the globe. The globe is surrounded by another white colored circle that says "for great services" on the top and a laurel wreath on the bottom.

The intermediate gilded block depicts Uzbekistan's national symbol, a Huma bird spreading its wings against the background of a rising sun. 

The weight of the order is 65 grams and its height is 7 millimeters.

Recipients by year

1996 

  Juan Antonio Samaranch – President of the IOC (awarded on August 29, 1996)
  Erkin Vohidov – National Poet of Uzbekistan (awarded on November 30, 1996)

1997 

  Turgun Alimatov – Uzbek folk music player (awarded on August 26, 1997)
  Said Ahmad Khusanhodzhaev - Playwright and writer (awarded on August 26, 1997)

1998 

  Leonid Kuchma – President of Ukraine (awarded on February 16, 1998)
  Ismail Dzhurabekov - First Deputy Prime Minister of Uzbekistan (awarded on August 27, 1998)
  Kozim Tulyaganov – mayor (Hokim) of Tashkent (awarded on August 27, 1998)
  Rakhim Akhmedov – People's Artist of Uzbekistan (awarded on August 27, 1998)
  Mutal Burhonov – musical composer (awarded on August 27, 1998)
  Zikir Muhammadjonov – actor (awarded on August 27, 1998)
  Nursultan Nazarbayev – President of Kazakhstan (awarded on October 31, 1998)
  Chinghiz Aitmatov – Kyrgyz writer (awarded on December 11, 1998)

1999 

  Ozod Sharafutdinov – editor-in-chief of the magazine Jahon adabiyeti (awarded on March 22, 1999)
  Salizhan Sharipov – Russian cosmonaut of Kyrgyz descent (awarded on July 29, 1999)
  Buribay Akhmedov – Uzbek scientist (awarded on August 25, 1999)
  Fazila Sulaimonova – leading researcher at the Academy of Sciences (awarded on August 25, 1999)

2000 

  Gʻafur Gʻulom – Soviet Uzbek academician (awarded posthumously on August 25, 2000)
  Musa Tashmukhamedov – Soviet Uzbek poet and writer (awarded posthumously on August 25, 2000)
  Abdulla Qahhor – Soviet Uzbek playwright (awarded posthumously on August 25, 2000)
  Tuychi Tashmukhamedov – Soviet Uzbek folk musician (awarded posthumously on August 25, 2000)
  Mukhitdin Kari-Yakubov – Soviet Uzbek actor and singer (awarded posthumously on August 25, 2000)
  Yunus Rajabi – Soviet Uzbek composer and academician (awarded posthumously on August 25, 2000)
  Abrar Khidoyatov – Soviet Uzbek theater actor (awarded posthumously on August 25, 2000)
  Jurahan Sultanov – Soviet Uzbek actor, singer, and composer (awarded posthumously on August 25, 2000)
  Mamurjon Uzakov – Soviet Uzbek singer (awarded posthumously on August 25, 2000)
  Kamiljan Ataniyazov – Soviet Uzbek singer and musician (awarded posthumously on August 25, 2000)
  Botir Zokirov – Soviet Uzbek singer, writer, and actor (awarded posthumously on August 25, 2000)
  Malik Nabiev – Soviet Uzbek artist (awarded on August 25, 2000)
  Halima Nosirova – Soviet Uzbek opera singer (awarded on August 25, 2000)

2001 

  Lutfi Sarimsoqova – Soviet Uzbek actress (awarded posthumously on August 22, 2001)
  Mukarram Turgunbaeva – Soviet Uzbek ballet dancer (awarded posthumously on August 22, 2001)
  Shukur Burkhanov – Soviet Uzbek actor (awarded posthumously on August 22, 2001)
  Tamara Khanum – Soviet Uzbek actress of Armenian descent (awarded posthumously on August 22, 2001)
  Sadriddin Ayni – Soviet Tajik writer and scholar (awarded posthumously on August 22, 2001)
  Maksud Mirtemir – Soviet Uzbek poet and playwright (awarded posthumously on August 22, 2001)
  Mirtemir Tursunov – Soviet Uzbek poet (awarded posthumously on August 22, 2001)
  Mirkarim Osimov – Soviet Uzbek writer (awarded posthumously on August 22, 2001)
  Ural Tansykbayev – Soviet Uzbek painter of Kazakh descent (awarded posthumously on August 22, 2001)
  Chingiz Akhmarov – Soviet Uzbek artist of Tatar descent (awarded posthumously on August 22, 2001)
  Khoji Abdurasulov – Soviet Uzbek artist (awarded posthumously on August 22, 2001)
  Mannon Uyghur – Soviet Uzbek actor and playwright (awarded posthumously on August 22, 2001)
  Maria Kuznetsova – Soviet Uzbek artist (awarded posthumously on August 22, 2001)
  Abbas Bakirov – Soviet Uzbek actor and theater director (awarded posthumously on August 22, 2001)
  Usta-Shirin Muradov – Soviet Uzbek artist (awarded posthumously on August 22, 2001)
  Nabi Ganiev – Soviet Uzbek actor, film director, and screenwriter (awarded posthumously on August 22, 2001)
  Murojon Akhmedov – Soviet Uzbek artist (awarded posthumously on August 22, 2001)
  Edward Rtveladze – Soviet Uzbek academician of Georgian descent (awarded on August 22, 2001)
  Saodat Kabulova – Soviet Uzbek opera singer and actress (awarded on August 24, 2001)
  Utkir Khashimov – Soviet Uzbek writer (awarded on August 24, 2001)

2002 

  Khabib Abdullaev – Soviet Uzbek academician (awarded posthumously on August 23, 2002)
  Sodiq Azimov – Soviet Uzbek physicist (awarded posthumously on August 23, 2002)
  Tokhtasyn Jalilov – Soviet Uzbek composer (awarded posthumously on August 23, 2002)
  Ubay Oripov – Soviet Uzbek academician (awarded posthumously on August 23, 2002)
  Igor Savitsky – Soviet Russian painter and archaeologist (awarded posthumously on August 23, 2002)
  Tashmukhamed Sarymsakov – Soviet Uzbek mathematician (awarded posthumously on August 23, 2002)
  Sagdy Sirazhdinov – Soviet Uzbek politician and academician (awarded posthumously on August 23, 2002)
  Abid Sadykov – Soviet Uzbek chemist and politician (awarded posthumously on August 23, 2002)
  Hamid Sulaimonov – Soviet Uzbek scientist (awarded posthumously on August 23, 2002)
  Alim Khojaev – Soviet Uzbek actor and theater director (awarded posthumously on August 23, 2002)
  Sabir Yunusov – Soviet Uzbek chemist (awarded posthumously on August 23, 2002)
  Tashmuhamed Kara-Niyazov – Soviet Uzbek mathematician (awarded posthumously on August 23, 2002)
  Yahya Gulyamov – Soviet Uzbek archaeologist (awarded posthumously on August 23, 2002)
  Galina Pugachenkova – Soviet archaeologist and art historian (awarded on August 26, 2002)
  Abdukodir Khayitmetov – Soviet Uzbek scientist (awarded on August 26, 2002)
  Valdas Adamkus – President of Lithuania (awarded on September 27, 2002)

2003 

  Juan Carlos I of Spain – King of Spain (awarded on January 24, 2003)
  Queen Sofía of Spain – Queen of Spain (awarded on January 24, 2003)
  Aleksander Kwaśniewski – President of Poland (awarded on June 30, 2003)
  Vasit Vakhidov – Soviet Uzbek surgeon and scientist (awarded posthumously on August 25, 2003)
  Makhmud Mirzaev – Soviet Uzbek scientist (awarded posthumously on August 25, 2003)
  Askad Mukhtar – Soviet Uzbek writer and poet (awarded posthumously on August 25, 2003)
  Ibraghim Muminov – Soviet Uzbek scientist (awarded posthumously on August 25, 2003)
  Rahim Pirmuhamedov – Soviet Uzbek actor (awarded posthumously on August 25, 2003)
  Talib Sadykov – Soviet Uzbek composer and conductor (awarded posthumously on August 25, 2003)
  Saib Khojaev – Soviet Uzbek actor (awarded posthumously on August 25, 2003)
  Richard Schroeder – Russian and Soviet scientist (awarded posthumously on August 25, 2003)
  Gulom Alimov – Soviet Uzbek poet and playwright (awarded posthumously on August 25, 2003)
  Razzak Hamraev – Soviet Uzbek actor (awarded posthumously on August 25, 2003)
  Eduard Shevardnadze – President of Georgia (awarded on October 9, 2003)
  Georgi Parvanov – President of Bulgaria (awarded on November 18, 2003)
  Matyakub Koshchanov – Uzbek academician (awarded on December 18, 2003)
  Zhura Musaev – Uzbek academician (awarded on December 18, 2003)
  Yalkin Turakulov – Uzbek scientist (awarded on December 18, 2003)

2004 

  Khozhikhon Boltaev – Soviet Uzbek artist (awarded posthumously on August 23, 2004)
  Muhammadzhon Mirzaev – Soviet Uzbek composer (awarded posthumously on August 23, 2004)
  Hamid Olimjon – Soviet Uzbek writer and poet (awarded posthumously on August 23, 2004)
  Nabi Rakhimov – Soviet Uzbek actor (awarded posthumously on August 23, 2004)
  Vsevolod Ivanovich Romanovsky – Soviet Russian mathematician (awarded posthumously on August 23, 2004)
  Aimkhan Shamuratova – Soviet Uzbek actress of Karakalpak descent (awarded posthumously on August 23, 2004)
  Sarah Ishanturaeva – Soviet Uzbek actress (awarded posthumously on August 23, 2004)

2005 

  Batyr Valikhodzhaev – Soviet Uzbek academician (awarded posthumously on August 24, 2005)
  Shavkat Rakhmatullaev – Uzbek academician (awarded on August 24, 2005)
  Mamadzhan Rakhmanov – Uzbek academician (awarded on August 24, 2005)
  Yulduz Usmonova – Uzbek actress and singer (awarded on August 24, 2005)
  Zokir Almatov – Uzbek politician (awarded on August 24, 2005)

2006 

  Pirimkul Kadyrov – Uzbek writer (awarded on August 25, 2006)
  Rakhima Mavlanova – Uzbek academician (awarded on August 25, 2006)

2007 

  Ruslan Chagaev – Uzbek professional boxer (awarded on April 17, 2007)
  Timur Atakuziev – Uzbek scientist (awarded on August 27, 2007)
  Albert Ataliev – Uzbek surgeon (awarded on August 27, 2007)
  Orkhon Makhmudov – Uzbek politician (awarded on August 27, 2007)
  Mahmud Salokhiddinov – Uzbek academician (awarded on August 27, 2007)
  Abdulla Ubaidullaev – Uzbek politician (awarded on August 27, 2007)
  Gurbanguly Berdimuhamedow – President of Turkmenistan (awarded on October 17, 2007)

2008 

  Vladimir Putin – President of Russia (awarded on February 20, 2008)
  Suyima G'anieva – Uzbek scholar (awarded on August 25, 2008)
  Hashimjon Ismailov – Uzbek director (awarded on August 25, 2008)
  Mirzaatham Rakhimov – Uzbek scientist (awarded on August 25, 2008)
  Artur Taymazov – Russian and Uzbek wrestler and politician of Ossetian descent (awarded on August 25, 2008)
  Valdis Zatlers – President of Latvia (awarded on October 1, 2008)

2011 

  Munojot Yo‘lchiyeva – Uzbek singer (awarded on August 24, 2011)
  Muyassar Razzokova – Uzbek singer (awarded on August 24, 2011)

2012 

 Haruhiko Kuroda – president of the Asian Development Bank (awarded on February 16, 2012)

2013 

  Andris Berzins – President of Latvia (awarded on October 18, 2013)

2014 

  Azizkhon Kayumov – Uzbek scientist (awarded on August 22, 2014)

2015 

  Ravshan Irmatov – Uzbek FIFA referee (awarded on December 31, 2015)

2019 

  Bahadir Yuldashev – Uzbek artistic director (awarded on August 28, 2019)

References 

Awards established in 1996
Orders, decorations, and medals of Uzbekistan
1996 establishments in Uzbekistan